In biology, solenocytes are flagellated cells associated with excretion, osmoregulation and ionoregulation in many animals and in some chordates under the sub-phylum Cephalochordata.

These are the cells which form subtypes of protonephridium along with the other type i.e. flame cells. Flame cells can be distinguished from solenocytes as the former is usually ciliated whereas the latter is flagellated.

An example of organisms in which excretion is performed by solenocytic protonephridia is the genus Branchiostoma.

References 

Cell biology